Sokhna Galle (born 22 April 1994) is a French female triple jumper, who won an individual gold medal at the Youth World Championships.

References

External links

1994 births
Living people
French female triple jumpers
Athletes (track and field) at the 2010 Summer Youth Olympics